is an asteroid sample-return mission operated by the Japanese state space agency JAXA. It is a successor to the Hayabusa mission, which returned asteroid samples for the first time in June 2010. Hayabusa2 was launched on 3 December 2014 and rendezvoused in space with near-Earth asteroid 162173 Ryugu on 27 June 2018. It surveyed the asteroid for a year and a half and took samples. It left the asteroid in November 2019 and returned the samples to Earth on 5 December 2020 UTC. Its mission has now been extended through at least 2031, when it will rendezvous with the small, rapidly-rotating asteroid .

Hayabusa2 carries multiple science payloads for remote sensing and sampling, and four small rovers to investigate the asteroid surface and analyze the environmental and geological context of the samples collected.

Mission overview 

Asteroid 162173 Ryugu (formerly designated ) is a primitive carbonaceous near-Earth asteroid. Carbonaceous asteroids are thought to preserve the most pristine, untainted materials in the Solar System, a mixture of minerals, ice, and organic compounds that interact with each other. Studying it is expected to provide additional knowledge on the origin and evolution of the inner planets and, in particular, the origin of water and organic compounds on Earth, all relevant to the origin of life on Earth.

Initially, launch was planned for 30 November 2014, but was delayed to 3 December 2014 at 04:22:04 UTC (3 December 2014, 13:22:04 local time) on a H-IIA launch vehicle. Hayabusa2 launched together with PROCYON asteroid flyby space probe. PROCYON's mission was a failure. Hayabusa2 arrived at Ryugu on 27 June 2018, where it surveyed the asteroid for a year and a half and collected samples. It departed the asteroid in November 2019 and returned the samples to Earth in December 2020.

Compared to the previous Hayabusa mission, the spacecraft features improved ion engines, guidance and navigation technology, antennas, and attitude control systems. A kinetic penetrator (a high-explosive shaped charge) was shot into the asteroid surface to expose pristine sample material which was later collected for return to Earth.

Funding and history 
Following the initial success of Hayabusa, JAXA began studying a potential successor mission in 2007. In July 2009, Makoto Yoshikawa of JAXA presented a proposal titled "Hayabusa Follow-on Asteroid Sample Return Missions". In August 2010, JAXA obtained approval from the Japanese government to begin development of Hayabusa2. The cost of the project estimated in 2010 was 16.4 billion yen (US$).

In the week of 16 July 2018, commands were sent to move to a lower hovering altitude.

On 21 September 2018, the Hayabusa2 spacecraft ejected the first two rovers, Rover-1A (HIBOU) and Rover-1B (OWL), from about a  altitude that dropped independently to the surface of the asteroid. They functioned nominally and transmitted data. The MASCOT rover deployed successfully on 3 October 2018 and operated for about 16 hours as planned.

The first sample collection was scheduled to start in late October 2018, but the rovers encountered a landscape with large and small boulders but no surface soil for sampling. Therefore, it was decided to postpone the sample collection plans to 2019 and further evaluate various options for the landing. The first surface sample retrieval took place on 21 February 2019. On 5 April 2019, Hayabusa2 released an impactor to create an artificial crater on the asteroid surface. The sub-surface sampling took place on 11 July 2019. The spacecraft departed the asteroid on 13 November 2019 (with departure command sent at 01:05 UTC on 13 November 2019). It successfully delivered the samples back to Earth on 6 December 2020 (JST), dropping the contents by parachute in a special container at a location in southern Australia. The samples were retrieved the same day for secure transport back to the JAXA labs in Japan.

Spacecraft 

The design of Hayabusa2 is based on the first Hayabusa spacecraft, with some improvements. It has a mass of  including fuel, and electric power is generated by two sets of solar arrays with an output of 2.6 kW at 1 AU, and 1.4 kW at 1.4 AU. The power is stored in eleven inline-mounted 13.2 Ah lithium-ion batteries.

Propulsion
The spacecraft features four solar-electric ion thrusters for propulsion called μ10, one of which is a backup. These engines use microwaves to convert xenon into plasma (ions), which are accelerated by a voltage applied by the solar panels and ejected out the back of the engine. The simultaneous operation of three engines generates thrusts of up to 28 mN.

The spacecraft has four redundant reaction wheels and a chemical reaction control system featuring twelve thrusters for attitude control (orientation) and orbital control at the asteroid.

Communication
The primary contractor NEC built the  spacecraft, its Ka-band communications system and a mid-infrared camera. The spacecraft has two high-gain directional antennas for X-band and Ka-band. Bit rates are 8 bit/s to 32 kbit/s. The ground stations are the Usuda Deep Space Center, Uchinoura Space Center, NASA Deep Space Network and Malargüe Station (ESA).

Navigation
The optical navigation camera telescope (ONC-T) is a telescopic framing camera with seven colors to optically navigate the spacecraft. It works in synergy with the optical navigation camera wide-field (ONC-W2) and with two star trackers.

In order to descend to the asteroid surface to perform sampling, the spacecraft released one of five target markers in the selected landing zones as artificial guide marks, with highly reflective outer material that is recognized by a strobe light mounted on the spacecraft. The spacecraft also used its laser altimeter and ranging (LIDAR) as well as Ground Control Point Navigation (GCP-NAV) sensors during sampling.

Firsts 
The Hayabusa2 spacecraft was the first to deploy operating rovers on an asteroid.

Science payload 

The Hayabusa2 payload is equipped with multiple scientific instruments:
 Remote sensing: Optical Navigation Camera (ONC-T, ONC-W1, ONC-W2), Near-Infrared Camera (NIR3), Thermal-Infrared Camera (TIR), Light Detection And Ranging (LIDAR)
 Sampling: Sampling device (SMP), Small Carry-on Impactor (SCI), Deployable Camera (DCAM3)
 Four rovers: Mobile Asteroid Surface Scout (MASCOT), Rover-1A, Rover-1B, Rover-2.

Remote sensing 
The Optical Navigation Cameras (ONCs) were used for spacecraft navigation during the asteroid approach and proximity operations. They also remotely imaged the surface to search for interplanetary dust around the asteroid. ONC-T is a telephoto camera with a 6.35° × 6.35° field of view and several optical filters carried in a carousel. ONC-W1 and ONC-W2 are wide angle (65.24° × 65.24°) panchromatic (485–655 nm) cameras with nadir and oblique views, respectively.

The Near-Infrared Spectrometer (NIRS3) is a spectrograph operating at a wavelength of 1.8–3.2 μm. NIRS3 was used for analysis of surface mineral composition.

The Thermal-Infrared Imager (TIR) is a thermal infrared camera working at 8–12 μm, using a two-dimensional microbolometer array. Its spatial resolution is 20 m at 20 km distance or 5 cm at 50 m distance (70 ft at 12 mi, or 2 in at 160 ft). It was used to determine surface temperatures in the range .

The Light Detection And Ranging (LIDAR) instrument measured the distance from the spacecraft to the asteroid surface by measuring the reflected laser light. It operated over an altitude range between 30 m and 25 km (100 ft and 16 mi).

When the spacecraft was closer to the surface than  during the sampling operation, the Laser Range Finders (LRF-S1, LRF-S3) were used to measure the distance and the attitude (orientation) of the spacecraft relative to the terrain. The LRF-S2 monitored the sampling horn to trigger the sampling projectile.

LIDAR and ONC data are being combined to determine the detailed topography (dimensions and shape) of the asteroid. Monitoring of a radio signal from Earth allowed measurement of the asteroid's gravitational field.

Rovers 
Hayabusa2 carried four small rovers to explore the asteroid surface in situ, and provide context information for the returned samples. Due to the minimal gravity of the asteroid, all four rovers were designed to move around by short hops instead of using normal wheels. They were deployed at different dates from about  altitude and fell freely to the surface under the asteroid's weak gravity. The first two rovers, called HIBOU (previously Rover-1A) and OWL (previously Rover-1B), landed on asteroid Ryugu on 21 September 2018. The third rover, called MASCOT, was deployed 3 October 2018. Its mission was successful. The fourth rover, known as Rover-2 or MINERVA-II-2, failed before release from the orbiter. It was released on 2 October 2019 to orbit the asteroid and perform gravitational measurements before being allowed to impact the asteroid a few days later.

MINERVA-II 

MINERVA-II is a successor to the MINERVA lander carried by Hayabusa. It consists of two containers with 3 rovers.

MINERVA-II-1 is a container that deployed two rovers, Rover-1A (HIBOU) and Rover-1B (OWL), on 21 September 2018. It was developed by JAXA and the University of Aizu. They move by hopping in the low gravitational field, using a torque generated by rotating masses within the rovers. Their scientific payload is a stereo camera, wide-angle camera, and thermometers. Solar cells and double-layer capacitors provide the electrical power. The MINERVA-II-1 rovers were successfully deployed 21 September 2018. Both rovers performed successfully on the asteroid surface, sending images and video from the surface. Rover-1A operated for 113 asteroid days (36 Earth days) returning 609 images from the surface, and Rover-1B operated for 10 asteroid days (3 Earth days) returning 39 images from the surface.

The MINERVA-II-2 container held the ROVER-2 (sometimes referred to as MINERVA-II-2), developed by a consortium of universities led by Tohoku University in Japan. It had two cameras, a thermometer and an accelerometer. It was equipped with optical and ultraviolet LEDs to illuminate and detect floating dust particles. ROVER-2 carried four mechanisms to move around using short hops. Rover-2 had problems prior to deployment from the orbiter but was released on 2 October 2019 to orbit the asteroid and perform gravitational measurements. It was then crashed onto the asteroid surface a few days later on 8 October 2019.

MASCOT 

The Mobile Asteroid Surface Scout (MASCOT) was developed by the German Aerospace Center (DLR) in cooperation with the French space agency CNES. MASCOT carries four instruments: an infrared spectrometer (MicrOmega), a magnetometer (MASMAG), a radiometer (MARA), and a camera (MASCAM) that imaged the small-scale structure, distribution and texture of the regolith. The rover is capable of tumbling once to reposition itself for further measurements. It collected data on the surface structure and mineralogical composition, the thermal behaviour and the magnetic properties of the asteroid. It has a non-rechargeable battery that allowed for operations for approximately 16 hours. The infrared radiometer on the InSight Mars lander, launched in 2018, is based on the MASCOT radiometer.

MASCOT was deployed 3 October 2018. It had a successful landing and performed its surface mission successfully. Two papers were published describing the results from MASCOT in the scientific journals Nature Astronomy and Science. One finding of the research was that C-type asteroids consist of more porous material than previously thought, explaining a deficit of this meteorite type. Meteorites of this type are too porous to survive the entry into the atmosphere of planet Earth. Another finding was that Ryugu consists of two different almost black types of rock with little internal cohesion, but no dust was detected. A third paper describing results from MASCOT was published in the Journal of Geophysical Research and describes the magnetic properties of Ryugu, showing that Ryugu does not have a magnetic field on a boulder scale.

Objects deployed by Hayabusa2

Sampling 

The original plan was for the spacecraft to collect up to three samples:
1) surface material that exhibits traits of hydrous minerals;
2) surface material with either unobservable or weak evidence of aqueous alterations;
3) excavated sub-surface material.

The first two surface samples were scheduled to start in late October 2018, but the rovers showed large and small boulders and insufficient surface area to sample, so the mission team decided to postpone sampling to 2019 and evaluate various options. The first surface sampling was completed on 22 February 2019 and obtained a substantial amount of topsoil, so the second surface sampling was postponed and was eventually cancelled to decrease the risks to the mission.

All samples are stored in separate sealed containers inside the sample return capsule (SRC).

Surface sample 
Hayabusa2 sampling device is based on Hayabusa. The first surface sample retrieval was conducted on 21 February 2019, which began with the spacecraft's descent, approaching the surface of the asteroid. When the sampler horn attached to Hayabusa2 underside touched the surface, a  tantalum projectile (bullet) was fired at  into the surface. The resulting ejected materials were collected by a "catcher" at the top of the horn, which the ejecta reached under their own momentum under microgravity conditions.

Sub-surface sample 

The sub-surface sample collection required an impactor to create a crater in order to retrieve material under the surface, not subjected to space weathering. This required removing a large volume of surface material with a powerful impactor. For this purpose, Hayabusa2 deployed on 5 April 2019 a free-flying gun with one "bullet", called the Small Carry-on Impactor (SCI); the system contained a  copper projectile, shot onto the surface with an explosive propellant charge. Following SCI deployment, Hayabusa2 also left behind a deployable camera (DCAM3) to observe and map the precise location of the SCI impact, while the orbiter maneuvered to the far side of the asteroid to avoid being hit by debris from the impact.

It was expected that the SCI deployment would induce seismic shaking of the asteroid, a process considered important in the resurfacing of small airless bodies. However, post-impact images from the spacecraft revealed that little shaking had occurred, indicating the asteroid was significantly less cohesive than was expected.

Approximately 40 minutes after separation, when the spacecraft was at a safe distance, the impactor was fired into the asteroid surface by detonating a  shaped charge of plasticized HMX for acceleration. The next step was the deployment on 4 June 2019 of a reflective target marker in the area near the crater to assist with navigation and descent. The touchdown and sampling took place on 11 July 2019.

Sample return 

The spacecraft collected and stored the samples in separate sealed containers inside the sample-return capsule (SRC), which is equipped with thermal insulation.

At the end of the science phase in November 2019, Hayabusa2 used its ion engines for changing orbit and return to Earth. Hours before Hayabusa2 flew past Earth in late 2020, it released the capsule, on 5 December 2020 at 05:30 UTC. The capsule was released spinning at one revolution per three seconds. The sample capsule landed at the Woomera Test Range in Australia.

Any volatile substances will be collected before the sealed containers are opened. The samples will be curated and analyzed at JAXA's Extraterrestrial Sample Curation Center, where international scientists can request a small portion of the samples. The spacecraft brought back a capsule containing carbon-rich asteroid fragments that scientists believe could provide clues about the ancient delivery of water and organic molecules to Earth.

JAXA is sharing a portion of these samples with NASA, and in exchange, NASA will provide JAXA a percentage of a sample of asteroid Bennu, when the agency's OSIRIS-REx spacecraft returns to Earth from the space rock in 2023.

NASA received 23 millimeter-sized grains and 4 containers of even finer material from Ryugu—10 percent of the total collected – from JAXA on 30 November 2019.

Mission extension (Hayabusa2♯) 

With the successful return and retrieval of the sample capsule on 6 December 2020 (JST), Hayabusa2 will now use its remaining  of xenon propellant (from the initial ) to extend its service life and fly out to explore new targets. The observation of  will be a high-speed fly-by of the L-type asteroid, a relatively uncommon type of asteroid. The fixed camera of Hayabusa2 was not designed for this type of fly-by. The rendezvous with  will be the first visit of a fast rotating micro-asteroid, with a rotation period of about 10 minutes. Between 2021 and 2026, the spacecraft will also conduct observations of exoplanets.

Selected EAEEA (Earth → Asteroid → Earth → Earth → Asteroid) scenario:
 December 2020: Extension mission start
 2021 until July 2026: cruise operation
 December 2027: Earth swing-by
 June 2028: Second Earth swing-by
 July 2031: Target body rendezvous

The nickname of the Extended Mission is “Hayabusa2♯” (read “Hayabusa2 Sharp”). The character “♯”  is a musical symbol that means “raise the note by a semitone”, and for this mission, it is also the acronym for “Small Hazardous Asteroid Reconnaissance Probe”. This name indicates that the Hayabusa2 Extended Mission is set to investigate small but potentially dangerous asteroids that may collide with the Earth in the future. The English meaning of the word “sharp” also highlights the extremely challenging nature of this mission, which is also reflected in the musical meaning of “raise the note by a semitone”, suggestive of raising of the rank of the mission.
As the character “♯” is a musical symbol, it can be difficult to enter in practice when typing. The symbol can therefore be substituted for the “#” symbol (number sign / pound / hash) that is on computer keyboards or phones. There is no problem with the notation “Hayabusa2♯” (musical symbol) or “Hayabusa2#”.

See also 

 Abiogenesis
 
 OSIRIS-REx – NASA asteroid sample return mission to 101955 Bennu (operational at the same time as Hayabusa2)
 Panspermia

Japanese minor body probes 
 
 
 
 Suisei spacecraft

Notes

References

External links 

 Hayabusa2 project website
 JAXA Hayabusa2 website
 Hayabusa2 Science Data Archives hosted by the DARTS archive (ISAS)
 MASCOT related publications by the Institute of Planetary Research hosted by Europlanet
 Hayabusa2 images scientific commentary , University of Tokyo
 Asteroid Explorer Hayabusa2, NEC
 Hayabusa2 3D model, Asahi Shinbun

2014 in Japan
Japanese space probes
Missions to near-Earth asteroids
Sample return missions
Astrobiology space missions
Exoplanet search projects
Space probes launched in 2014
Spacecraft launched by H-II rockets
Articles containing video clips